The 2009-10 season was FC Dacia Chisinau's 8th Moldovan National Division season, in which they finished the season in 5th place, qualifying for UEFA Europa League. They were also Runners Up to Sheriff Tiraspol in the Moldovan Cup and were knocked out of the 2009-10 UEFA Europa League by MŠK Žilina at the Second Qualifying round.

Squad

Out on loan

Transfer

Summer

In:

Out:

Winter

In:

Out:

Competitions

National Division

Results summary

Results

Table

Moldovan Cup

UEFA Europa League

Qualifying round

Squad statistics

Appearances and goals

|-
|colspan="14"|Players away from Dacia Chişinău on loan:

|-
|colspan="14"|Players who appeared for Dacia Chişinău no longer at the club:

|}

Goal scorers

Disciplinary record

References 

Dacia
FC Dacia seasons